Alphonse James is a given name. Notable people with the name include:

 Alphonse James de Rothschild (1827-1905), French financier, vineyard owner, art collector, philanthropist and racehorse owner and breeder
 Alphonse James Schladweiler (1902-1996), American prelate of the Roman Catholic Church

See also
 Alphonse (disambiguation)

Masculine given names